Pinjarra Power Station is a natural gas-fired power station in Western Australia.  It is a 280 MW base load cogeneration power station located in Alcoa's Pinjarra Alumina Refinery, near the town of Pinjarra, approximately 80 km south of Perth. Generated electricity is sold by Alinta Energy to contracted customers or into the Wholesale Energy Market. In addition to electricity, the power station supplies steam to Alcoa's refinery.

External links 
 Alinta Energy – Pinjarra Power Station

Natural gas-fired power stations in Western Australia